Grevillea dryandri is a species of flowering plant in the family Proteaceae and is endemic to northern Australia. It is a spreading to erect shrub with divided leaves with up to seventy or more linear to narrowly elliptic leaves, and long clusters of red, orange-red, pink or white flowers.

Description
The lower surface of the leaflets is silky-hairy.

Taxonomy
Grevillea dryandri was first formally described in 1810 by Robert Brown in the Transactions of the Linnean Society of London from specimens collected in Arnhem Land. The specific epithet (dryandri) honours Jonas Carlsson Dryander.

In 1986, Donald McGillivray described two subspecies of G. dryandri and the names are accepted by the Australian Plant Census:

Distribution and habitat
Subspecies dasycarpa grows in shrubby woodland on sandstone between Mataranka, Daly River and the Gove Peninsula in the northern part of the Northern Territory. Subspecies dryandri grows in open woodland or open shrubland, often in rocky places, from the Kimberley region of Western Australia, to the Northern Territory north of about Tennant Creek and to northern parts of Queensland, mainly as far as Mount Isa and Normanton.

Conservation status
Both subspecies of G. dryandri are listed as of "least concern" under the Northern Territory Government Territory Parks and Wildlife Conservation Act.

References

dryandri
Flora of the Northern Territory
Flora of Queensland
Eudicots of Western Australia
Proteales of Australia
Plants described in 1810
Taxa named by Robert Brown (botanist, born 1773)